Uda Pussellawa Railway (UPR) or Udupussallawa Railway (Sinhala: උඩුපුස්සැල්ලාව දුම්රිය මාර්ගය Uḍupussællāwa Dumriya Mārgaya) was a  narrow gauge railway line that existed in Ceylon (now Sri Lanka) between 1903 and 1948. The line connected Nanu Oya railway station with Ragala via Nuwara Eliya.

History
The closest station to Nuwara Eliya on the existing heavy gauge railway line (Main Line) was Nanu Oya railway station. They asked for a railway track from Nanu Oya to Nuwara Eliya from the British governor Sir West Ridgeway, who was on a trip to Nuwara Eliya on 25 April 1895. Considering their appeal initial work on the track was commenced in November 1900. The first stage up to Nuwara Eliya was completed and opened on 14 December 1903 by Sir Henry Blake, Nuwara Eliya to Kandapola on 21 December 1903 and the final stage from Kandapola to Ragala was completed in July 1904. The cost of construction was about £5,500 per mile and is equivalent in purchasing power to about £412,098.49 or Rs 88,358,036.72 per kilometer in 2019.

Infrastructure
The line was constructed in  gauge. The highest elevation on the line was at Kandapola railway station.

Rolling stock
The first steam engine to run on this line was imported in 1902 from the Fast Stewart company in England. The famous CGR class H1 steam engine has also performed on this line for few years.

Operations
In 1920 five goods trains and eleven mixed trains were operating on this line. There was a special luxury compartment for governor's journeys.

Decline and closure
In the 1940s transportation by lorries was getting popular and demand for the railway transport was gradually decreasing. Road transport in this area became faster than railway transport. So the services on the line was incurring losses day by day.

In January 1940, all passenger services were withdrawn and only two freight trains were in operation between Nanu Oya and Ragala.

Considering the operational difficulties, the government decided to abandon this line. In 1942, the first stage from Nanu Oya to Nuwara Eliya was removed, and later in 1948 the remaining part up to Ragala was removed. On 2 August 1948 all services were withdrawn and the line was completely removed.

Former stations
The Udupussallawa line had five stations: Blackpool; Nuwara Eliya; Kandeppola; Brookside and terminating at the Ragala railway station.

Although the railway line was removed the former railway station buildings were not removed and parcel transfer services were conducted from these stations for many years following the closure.  Some ruins of these stations can be seen even today. Some are used as government offices.

See also

 Sri Lanka Railways
 CGR class H1

References

Railway lines in Sri Lanka
2 ft 6 in gauge railways in Sri Lanka